The Tifton and Northeastern Railroad was chartered on October 15, 1891, and built a 25-mile line from Tifton, Georgia, United States to Fitzgerald, Georgia in 1896. The T&N was consolidated with the Atlantic and Birmingham Railroad and the Tifton, Thomasville and Gulf Railway on December 3, 1903, to form the Atlantic and Birmingham Railway. It then became part of the Atlanta, Birmingham and Atlantic Railroad when it took over the A&B on April 12, 1906.

References

Defunct Georgia (U.S. state) railroads
Predecessors of the Atlantic Coast Line Railroad
Railway companies established in 1891
Railway companies disestablished in 1903